Hazel Brunker (born 16 October 1932) is a Welsh chess player, eight-times Welsh Women's Chess Championship winner (1969, 1970, 1972, 1973, 1982, 1985, 1989, 1990).

Biography
From the late 1960s to the early 1990s, Hazel Brunker was one of the best chess female player in Wales. She has won eight times in the Welsh Women's Chess Championships: 1969 (jointly), 1970, 1972, 1973, 1982 (jointly), 1985, 1989, and 1990.

Hazel Brunker played for Wales in the Chess Olympiads:
 In 1976, at second board in the 7th Chess Olympiad (women) in Haifa (+2, =2, -6),
 In 1978, at third board in the 8th Chess Olympiad (women) in Buenos Aires (+2, =3, -5),
 In 1980, at first reserve board in the 9th Chess Olympiad (women) in Valletta (+2, =1, -5),
 In 1982, at third board in the 10th Chess Olympiad (women) in Lucerne (+2, =1, -3).

References

External links

Hazel Brunker chess games at 365chess.com

1932 births
Living people
Welsh chess players
Chess Olympiad competitors